The Country and Western Hour on Channel Nine Adelaide was an Australian television show featuring Country music. The format was shown as a barn setting with hay bales, fences, implements, riding gear etc. Colin Huddleston called square dancing each night with at least two squares of dancers. Ernie Sigley, Roger Cardwell and Reg Lindsay took on the hosting at various times.

References

External links

Mass media in New South Wales
Culture of Adelaide
Australian music television series